Team WE, formerly known as World Elite, is a Chinese esports organisation based in Xi'an. It is one of the oldest esports organisations in China.

League of Legends

Roster

Tournament highlights 
 2nd – Intel Extreme Masters Season IX – World Championship

Warcraft III

Former players

References

External links 

 

Esports teams based in China
League of Legends Pro League teams
Hearthstone teams
Warcraft III teams